Matt Mulhern (born July 21, 1960) is an American actor and historian who has starred in such films as One Crazy Summer and Biloxi Blues, and such television series such as Major Dad, JAG, and Rescue Me (playing Lt. John Stackhouse).

Mulhern attended Pascack Hills High School in Montvale, New Jersey.

Mulhern was trained as an actor by William Esper at Mason Gross School of the Arts of Rutgers University, where he received a BFA in Acting in 1982. He was first cast as Joseph Wykowski in Neil Simon's Tony Award winning Biloxi Blues. From there, he went on to a film, TV, and theater career as an actor, appearing in films such as One Crazy Summer, Extreme Prejudice, Biloxi Blues, Junior, Walking to the Waterline, Infinity, The Sunchaser, and others.

New York theater credits include: The One-Armed Man at Ensemble Studio Theater, Surviving Grace at the Union Square Theater, The Night Hank Williams Died at the Orpheum Theater, Wasted at the WPA. Regional appearances at La Jolla Playhouse in The Glass Menagerie, The Habitation of Dragons, at Pittsburgh Public Theater, the National Tour of Death of a Salesman as Biff opposite Hal Holbrook, and The Orphans Home Cycle at Hartford Stage.

On TV, Mulhern played Lieutenant Eugene "Gene" Holowachuk on the top-ten CBS hit Major Dad from 1989 through 1993. Other guest appearances include NBC's Third Watch, Law and Order, Law and Order: Criminal Intent, Law and Order: Special Victims Unit,The Education of Max Bickford and Ed; a recurring role on FX's Rescue Me; and appearances on Fox's Fringe; and CBS's CSI, Blue Bloods.

He has written and directed two films, Walking to the Waterline, in which he also acted, and Duane Hopwood, starring David Schwimmer, which Roger Ebert named one of 2005's best films.

He also wrote a novel, Crossing Open Spaces, published by CreateSpace in March 2009.

After a 35-year career he left acting, writing, and directing in 2015, and received a master's degree in history from City College-CUNY in 2019. He is currently pursuing a PhD. in history at Fordham University.

Mulhern lives north of New York City with his wife, Karen, an interior designer, trained at UCLA and NYC's Institute of Classical Architecture and Art (ICAA). He and Karen have two grown sons, Connor, a composer, and Jack, an actor.

Filmography

References

External links
 

1960 births
Living people
American male film actors
American male television actors
Male actors from Philadelphia
Pascack Hills High School alumni